Rewati Raman Khanal (9 July 1935 – 27 October 2020) was a Nepalese law scholar and writer. He served as the chief secretary of the Narayanhiti Palace for 35 years. He wrote multiple books on the legal and bureaucratic system of Nepal and receive the Madan Puraskar for his book Nepali Kanooni Itihasko Rooprekha in 2002 (2059 BS).

Biography 
Khanal was born on 9 July 1935 (25 Asar 1992 BS) in Chundi village of Tanahu district to father Gobardan Khanal and mother Yashoda Devi Khanal. 

Khanal died on 27 October 2020 (11 Kartik 2077 BS) in his residence at Kalimati, Kathmandu. He is survived by his wife and three children (one daughter and two sons).

Books 

 Muluki Ain Kehi Bibechana
 Kar Sambandhi Kanoon
 Rit Nibedan Siddhanta ra Bibechana
 Nepali Kanooni Itihasko Rooprekha
 Nepali Kanooni Masyauda
 Samalochana ra Faisala
 Rajnitik Kusumakar
 Dharmik Katha Sangraha

Awards 
Khanal won the Madan Puraskar for Nepali Kanooni Itihasko Rooprekha, a book on the historical outline of Nepalese law, in 2002 (2059 BS).

References

2020 deaths
Madan Puraskar winners
Nepali-language writers
Khas people
1935 births
20th-century Nepalese writers
People from Tanahun District
20th-century Nepalese male writers